is a Japanese baseball player. He has been with the Fukuoka SoftBank Hawks since 2006, and plays as second baseman, wearing number 46. In 2008, he batted .291. From 2006 to 2009 he was .670 on-base plus slugging.

In 2013, he played for Japanese national baseball team in 2013 WBC

External links

 Career statistics - NPB.jp
 80 Yuichi Honda PLAYERS2021 - Fukuoka SoftBank Hawks Official site

1984 births
2013 World Baseball Classic players
Fukuoka SoftBank Hawks players
Japanese baseball coaches
Japanese baseball players
Living people
Nippon Professional Baseball coaches
Nippon Professional Baseball infielders
People from Ōnojō
Baseball people from Fukuoka Prefecture